Winthorpe is a village located  northeast of Newark-on-Trent in Nottinghamshire, England. The population at the 2011 census was 650.
The name is probably from old English wynne þrop (thorp), hamlet of joy.

Winthorpe has a village hall, a local pub called the Lord Nelson and a community centre where the events range from a monthly lunch club to an annual Bonfire night celebration. Winthorpe also has a long-standing cricket tradition and has been the home to Winthorpe Cricket Club since 1887.All Saints' Church, Winthorpe is the Church of England parish church in the village.

Newark Air Museum is an air museum located on the former Royal Air Force station, RAF Winthorpe. The airfield was mainly used for training Lancaster crews.

References

External links

 Winthorpe Village Website
 Winthorpe Cricket Club

Villages in Nottinghamshire
Newark and Sherwood